1802 was a year of the Gregorian and Julian calendar.

1802 may also refer to:

BMW 1802, a car model
RCA 1802, a microprocessor